TDRS-1, known before launch as TDRS-A, was an American communications satellite, operated by NASA as part of the Tracking and Data Relay Satellite System.

History
While on the pad, problems were detected with Challenger main engines and repairs were begun. During this time, a severe storm caused contamination of TDRS-1 while it was in the Payload Change-out Room on the Rotating Service Structure at the launch pad. Consequently, the satellite had to be taken back to its checkout facility, where it was cleaned and rechecked. Challenger finally lifted off from Launch Complex 39A of the Kennedy Space Center at 18:30:00 UTC on 4 April 1983.

Operations
Following deployment from Challenger, TDRS-1 was to be raised to its operational geosynchronous orbit by means of an Inertial Upper Stage, which consisted of two solid rocket motors, the first used to raise the orbit's apogee, the second its perigee. The first burn was successful, however the IUS went out of control during the second burn. TDRS-1 separated from the upper stage in a lower than planned orbit. It was eventually raised to geosynchronous orbit by means of its attitude control system. In order to achieve this, a team of engineers from the Goddard Space Flight Center in Greenbelt, Maryland worked for nearly three months using six one-pound thrusters on the errant satellite to push it  higher in space. The failure was later identified as a collapsed second-stage nozzle Techroll Seal, a flexible ring which allows the nozzle to move and provide directional control. In connection with this rescue, Goddard Space Flight Center on 26 November 1984 honored a group of 34 individuals with the Robert H. Goddard Award of Merit, the highest level of recognition the Goddard Space Flight Center can bestow on its employees. In 1989 its operations were affected by a geomagnetic storm.

TDRS-1 formed part of the first Pole-to-Pole phone call on 28 April 1999, with TDRS-1 being used at the South Pole, and an Iridium phone being used at the North Pole (recorded in Ripley's Believe It Or Not and Guinness World Records in April 1999).

Mission duration
TDRS-1 had a design life of ten years, however in April 2008, it was still operational on the twenty-fifth anniversary of its launch. Over the years, the orbital inclination was allowed to increase so that, for portions of the day (approximately 5 hours), it was able to be used for communications with the North and then the South Pole. Along with Marisat F2, GOES 3 and LES-9, it was one of a number of satellites that were transferred to the US National Science Foundation in 1998, for communications with the Amundsen–Scott South Pole Station. After Marisat was retired, TDRS-1 became the primary means of communication with the research station. The last functioning traveling-wave tube amplifier aboard TDRS-1 failed in October 2009, rendering the spacecraft unusable for communications purposes.

TDRS-1 proved helpful during a 1999 medical emergency at the NSF's Antarctic Amundsen–Scott South Pole Station. The satellite's high-speed Internet connectivity allowed personnel to conduct telemedicine conferences. Doctors in the United States aided Dr. Jerri Nelson, who had breast cancer, in performing a self-biopsy and administering chemotherapy. Later, in 2002, doctors used TDRS-1 to perform another telemedicine conference with the station to assist in knee surgery for a meteorologist.

Because of its orbit, the satellite was able to link the North and South Poles and relayed the first pole-to-pole phone call. TDRS-1 also transmitted the first internet connection and live webcast from the North Pole and supported the first global television event from the South Pole Station - a worldwide television broadcast to commemorate the beginning of the year 2000.

Decommissioned
The spacecraft was retired on or about 21 October 2009, after 26 years. Decommissioning was started on 5 June 2010 and passivation was completed on 27 June 2010. , NASA had repositioned TDRS-3 to assume the duties of TDRS-1.

See also 

 List of TDRS satellites

References

External links
 NASA's TDRS-1 Remote Terminal System Installed at Canberra Deep Space Communication Complex
 NASA's Antarctic TDRS-1 Remote Ground Terminal Installed at McMurdo

Derelict satellites orbiting Earth
Partial satellite launch failures
Spacecraft launched in 1983
TDRS satellites
Spacecraft launched by the Space Shuttle
Spacecraft decommissioned in 2009